Uriah Fifield Strickland (November 7, 1907 – March 16, 1976) was a Canadian politician and master mariner. He represented the electoral districts of  Bonavista South, Trinity South, and Trinity North in the Newfoundland and Labrador House of Assembly. He was a member of the Liberal Party of Newfoundland and Labrador.

The son of George and Mary Ann Strickland, he was born in Hants Harbour, Newfoundland and was educated at the Salvation Army College in St. John's and at Memorial University College. Strickland was employed in fishing at Hants Harbour and then taught school for a time. He then earned his papers as a master mariner.

He was first elected to the Newfoundland assembly in 1956 for Bonavista South. He was elected by acclamation for Trinity South in 1959. Strickland served in the provincial cabinet as Minister of Municipal Affairs and Housing. He was elected for Trinity North in 1971 but was defeated when he ran for reelection in 1972.

References

1907 births
Liberal Party of Newfoundland and Labrador MHAs
1976 deaths